Powers Park is an unincorporated community located east-southeast of Marietta in Cobb County, Georgia, United States.

Powers Park consists of the 'POWERS FERRY 01' and 'TERRELL MILL 01' voting precincts. Clockwise, the area is defined by Lower Roswell Road, Old Paper Mill Road, Terrell Mill Road, Delk Road, Powers Ferry Road (both sides), Interstate 75, and South Marietta Parkway.

Powers Park features an eclectic mix of mostly small neighborhoods with single family residential homes built between 1950 and 1980.

Powers Creek and Powers Ferry Road run through the heart of the community. Notable attractions include Powers Ferry Elementary School, Sedalia Park Elementary School and Terrell Mill Park. Hence, the Powers Park name honors all five of these.

The area is popular with young homeowners, attracted by the community's convenient proximity to Interstate 75, Interstate 285, the bustling Cumberland / Galleria business district, and The Battery entertainment district, home of Truist Park and the Atlanta Braves.

Unincorporated communities in Cobb County, Georgia
Unincorporated communities in Georgia (U.S. state)